North China is a geographical region of China.

Northern China or North China may also refer to:

 North China Craton, an ancient continent studied in geology
 North China Plain
 Northern and southern China, two approximate geographical, culture and language regions in China
 North China, a fictional country in Full Metal Panic!
 Northern Chinese dialects, or Mandarin Chinese
 Northern and Southern dynasties, a period in the history of China that lasted from 420 to 589

See also
 Northwest China
 Northeast China